Marvel CyberComics or Webisodes were digital comics produced from 1996 to 2000 by Marvel Comics using Adobe Shockwave. The Marvel CyberComics were originally made available exclusively on the AOL web portal, but were later made freely available on the Marvel.com website. The Marvel CyberComics feature established Marvel characters such as Spider-Man and Wolverine and consist of a combination of comics and animation. The Marvel CyberComics were removed from the Marvel website in 2000, and the service was succeeded by Marvel Digital Comics Unlimited in 2007.

History
CyberComics were created by Marvel in the summer of 1996 as a part of a promotional deal with America Online. The CyberComics were placed into the AOL/Marvel Zone and were exclusively available to AOL users. In 1997 Marvel built their own website at MarvelOnline.com and the CyberComics were freely available to all users through registration on MarvelZone.com (due to the contract with AOL).

On September 17, 1999 NextPlanetOver.com (NPO), a now-defunct online comics store,  announced a one-year marketing and content licensing deal with Marvel Comics. Terms included a year of run-of-site advertising on Marvel.com. In addition, NextPlanetOver.com was sponsoring monthly CyberComics created exclusively for them by Marvel. NPO was bought out less than a year later and went bankrupt in 2000; the CyberComics were renamed into "Webisodes" and made available at Marvel.com for free without any registration.

The first characters to star in CyberComics were Spider-Man and Wolverine, soon followed by several others. The comics were not only canon to the mainstream but also tied in directly with Marvel's newsstand offerings. They came out on a monthly basis, in four parts consisting of eight pages each.

Using Macromedia's Shockwave software, readers guided the action by clicking through word balloons and following panels complete with animation, sound effects and music. CyberComics were still very much in the comic book or strip genre - the result was a cross between comics and animation.

The Cybercomics were made by taking penciled pages and transforming them through a program called "Electric Image Painter" and form-Z into the digital comics, colored in digitally in Adobe Illustrator.  Simple animations were created in Macromedia Shockwave, and Garry Schafer of grimmwerks created the soundscapes which drove the animations.  Done at a time previous to mp3 compression as common as it is now, only 4 channels of small, short soundscapes could be used at one time.

Due to financial reasons the production of new CyberComics ceased in 2000 and Marvel removed them from their website.

Having a huge back-issue archive, Marvel decided to save money by replacing Marvel CyberComics with Dotcomics. This successor would eventually become Marvel Unlimited.

Spider-Man

From 1996 till 1998 there was a run of the Spider-Man Cybercomics. They appeared monthly for 14 months in four eight-page, weekly installments/episodes. After the 52nd episode Marvel remade them officially into storylines:

Spider-Man Storyline # 01 - 01-04 (July 18, 1996):

Written by Scott Lobdell, penciled by Mark Bagley, guest-starring Chamber and Vertigo.

Spider-Man Storyline # 02 - 05-08: The Menace of Mysterio

Guest-starring Mysterio kidnapping J. Jonah Jameson.

Spider-Man Storyline # 03 - 09-12:

Guest-starring Morbius and the Lizard.

Spider-Man Storyline # 04: Shock Value - 13-16

Guest-starring The Hand, Kingpin, The Rose, Hammerhead, Shocker and Green Goblin. The fourth chapter of the story was penciled by Daerick Gross.

Spider-Man Storyline # 05: The Gamma Gambit - 17-20

Penciled by Daerick Gross, guest-starring Green Goblin and The Hulk.

Spider-Man Storyline # 06 - 21-24:

Spider-man in the Savage Land, featuring Ka-Zar, Shanna the She-Devil and Zabu.

Spider-Man Storyline # 07: Sandblasted - 25-28: Read it here! 

Peter Parker's latest gig as a freelance photographer is no day at the beach, thanks to the Sandman's untimely emergence. Featuring the Sandman at Coney Island with art by Daerick Gross.

Spider-Man Storyline # 08: Strange Heads
(This Storyline was included as a promo on a CD in Marvel Vision #25 and Ka-Zar #8)
Issue #29: (January 31, 1997): Peter Parker, MJ, Flash Thompson and Betty Brant get together to commemorate Gwen Stacy's death and decide to go visit the American Museum of Natural History. As the friends are on their tour, robbers attack and take MJ hostage. By John Lewandowski, Nghia Lam and Mark Badger!
Issue #30 (February 6, 1997): Spider-Man teams up with Doctor Strange in a story of webs and wizardry! By John Lewandowski, Nghia Lam and Mark Badger!
Issue #31 (February 13, 1997): Spider-Man and Doctor Strange confront the power of Hammerhead and the mystical might of the amulet of Aagara! It's all-out head to head Hammerhead action! By John Lewandowski and Nghia Lam!
Issue #32 (February 20, 1997): Spider-Man and Doc Strange take on Hammerhead and the mystical amulet of Aagara! By John Lewandowski, Nghia Lam and Mark Badger!

Spider-Man Storyline # 09: Electric

Issue #33:
Issue #34 (March 6, 1997): Spider-Man finds his personal life turned upside down as the movie about him continues to film in New York – with the promise to reveal his secret identity to the world! By Glenn Greenberg, Casey Jones and Atomic Paintbrush!
Issue #35 (March 13, 1997): The actor playing Spider-Man in the movie has gotten too caught up in the role – and now the real web-slinger's gotta come to his rescue! By Glenn Greenberg, Todd Nauck and Atomic Paintbrush!
Issue #36 (March 20, 1997): The villainous Electro holds a movie studio and Mary Jane hostage – and the Black Tarantula is looming on the horizon! By Glenn Greenberg, Todd Nauck and Atomic Paintbrush!

Spider-Man Storyline # 10: Black Tarantula

Issue #37:
Issue #38 (April 3, 1997): Spider-Man continues to face the menace of his newest foe, the Black Tarantula! By Tom DeFalco, Daerick Gross and Atomic Paintbrush!
Issue #39:
Issue #40 (April 16, 1997): Spider-Man makes the mistake of coming between Black Tarantula and his kai in the explosive finale! By Tom DeFalco, Daerick Gross and Atomic Paintbrush!

Spider-Man Storyline # -1: Flashback

Issue #41 (April 24, 1997): The beginning of an all-new saga! When the mutant-hating Friends of Humanity stage a rally at Empire State University, Peter Parker must confront the ugliness of bigotry! Plus: Spider-Man is accused of murder! By Glenn Greenberg, Ariel Olivetti and Atomic Paintbrush!
Issue #42 (May 1, 1997): Spider-Man is accused of murder and the mutant-hating Friends of Humanity group are out to make him pay! But the real murderer, one of Spidey's greatest enemies, remains at large and dangerous as ever! By Glenn Greenberg, Ariel Olivetti and Mark Badger!
Issue #43 (May 8, 1997): A Flashback-Month tie-in! The first multimedia crossover ever done! Joe Robertson is forced to choose between covering a news story – or becoming a part of it! By Tom DeFalco and Mark Badger!
Issue #44 (May 15, 1997): A Flashback-Month tie-in! Concluding the first multimedia crossover ever done! Joe Robertson is given a choice between covering a major news story or becoming a part of it!

Spider-Man Storyline # 11: Venom Saga

Issue #45 (May 23, 1997): Peter Parker and Betty Brant investigate the murder for which Spider-Man has been blamed---and run into the REAL killer!
Issue #46 (May 29, 1997): At last! Spider-Man tangles with the man who framed him for murder – and his name is Venom!
Issue #47 (June 5, 1997): Spider-Man in an all-out, knock-down, drag-out fight with his most dangerous enemy: Venom!
Issue #48 (June 12, 1997): The explosive conclusion to "Venom Saga", with Spider-Man and Betty Brant caught in the middle! By Glenn Greenberg, Daerick Gross and Mark Badger!

Spider-Man Storyline # 12: Deathlock Solution

Issue # 49 (June 19, 1997): Spider-Man moves to stop Deathlok from changing the course of history! Is it the right move for the webhead to be making, or is he in way over his head – again?! By Scott Lobdell, Mindy Newell, Nghia Lam and Atomic Paintbrush!
Issue # 50:
Issue # 51 (July 3, 1997): Swingin' on data! Trapped in the Cyberverse, Spider-Man and Deathlok attempt to stop Ryker's cyborgs from rewriting their programming, from the inside! By Andrew Ball and Nghia Lam!
Issue # 52 (July 10, 1997): The concluding chapter of the Spider-Man/Deathlok saga! Cyberspace was never this exciting! By Andrew Ball and Nghia Lam!

Spider-Man Storyline # 13: Path of Vengeance

Issue # 53 (July 30, 1997): Part One! Someone has targeted Osborn Industries for destruction – and Spider-Man fears it could be his worst enemy, back from the dead! By Glenn Greenberg, Pat Chau and Mark Badger!
Issue # 54:
Issue # 55 (August 13, 1997): Part Three! Spider-Man takes on the villain from his past who has targeted Osborn Industries for destruction - with Liz Allan Osborn caught in the middle! By Glenn Greenberg, Pat Chau and Atomic Paintbrush!
Issue # 56 (August 20, 1997): Part Four! Spider-Man takes on his old enemy, The Headsman, as the life of Liz Osborn hangs in the balance!

Spider-Man Storyline # 14: Maximum Plumage

Issue # 57 (August 27, 1997): Part One! Things turn fowl for Spider-Man when New York City is infiltrated by clones of Howard the Duck! By Glenn Greenberg and Daerick Gross!
Issue # 58 (September 3, 1997): Part Two! Doctor Bong is out to avenge himself upon Howard the Duck and Spider-Man finds himself drawn even deeper into this long-standing feud! By Glenn Greenberg, Daerick Gross and Mark Badger!
Issue # 59 (September 10, 1997): Part Three! At last: Spider-Man comes face-to-face with the diabolical Doctor Bong, with Howard the Duck caught in the middle! By Glenn Greenberg, Daerick Gross and Mark Badger!
Issue # 60 (September 17, 1997): Part Four! The conclusion to the mind-boggling Howard the Duck saga, featuring Spider-Man's showdown with the maniacal menace, known as Doctor Bong!

Spider-Man Storyline # 15: Doom Control 

(In five parts; 1998) His name is Von Doom. Victor Von Doom. And only Spider-Man can stop him from seizing control of all the minds in Manhattan. It can be seen completely here. By D. G. Chichester and Daerick Gross.

Heroes

 Blade (A one-shot; 21. August 1998)  The story is tied into the Wesley Snipes movie of the same name. Art by Daerick Gross. Read it here! 
 Captain America / Iron Man: Invasion Force (In four parts) Two of the Avengers' most prominent uncover the truth behind the new alien race, the Ravel, and must halt an alien invasion! Art by Daerick Gross. Read it here! 
 Daredevil (v.1): Protection Racket (In four parts; 1998) Featuring Daredevil's fight against Kingpin and Bullseye. By D. G. Chichester and Daerick Gross. Read it here! 
 Daredevil (v.2) #0: What a Life (A one-shot; September 1998) Written by Kevin Smith, with art by Joe Quesada & Jimmy Palmiotti A preview/prequel to the relaunched Daredevil title in 1998.
 Heroes Return (In five parts; 1997) It took place between issues #3 and #4 of the Heroes Reborn: The Return Limited Series. The Wall-crawler takes on the Green Goliath and encounters the Heroes Return super-heroes! By Tom DeFalco, Casey Jones and Rob Haynes.
 Marvel Milk Maniacs: Race for Destruction (A one-shot; 2000) Starring Captain America, the Hulk and Spider-Man. A promo CyberComic for drinking milk.
 Nick Fury / Black Widow: Jungle Warfare (In four parts) Nick Fury and the Black Widow race to defuse a bomb buried in the banks of the Panama Canal - without setting off any political landmines. Art by Casey Jones. Read it here! 
 Deadpool: Ride My Hard Drive, Baby! (In four parts; February 2000) In this quirky tale of everyone's favorite Merc-With-A-Mouth, Deadpool gets interactive as he ends up being downloaded into the computer, owned by his good buddy Weasel, and mayhem ensues in Cyberscape! Featuring appearances by Quasimodo, Vision, Captain America and Iron Man. "Ride My Hard Drive, Baby!" is written by Joe Kelly, with art by Casey Jones!

Mutants

 Gambit: The Hunt for the Tomorrow Stone (December 27, 1999) Was the first CyberComic referred to in a printed comic (in the pages of Gambit #12). The plot occurred approximately after Gambit #10 - Gambit helps Spat obtain the Tomorrow Stone to stop her de-aging and save her life. In his quest for it he encounters Sekhmet who needs the Stone herself to save her mother from the suspended animation she was put in by her husband. Sekhmet finally gets the Tomorrow Stone but provides it to Spat and saves her life. After that, Sekhmet goes on looking to find help for her mother (Assumedly, the Sekhmet story would have come up again in the Gambit comic, if it continued under Fabian Nicieza, but didn't since it was cancelled). Art by Daerick Gross.
 Wolverine: Merciless is the Mongrel by Tom DeFalco and Daerick Gross (In four parts; July 1996). This was one of the two first Marvel CyberComics ever (the other one was with Spider-Man). Pale Flower is playing a dangerous game, with Wolverine in the middle. Can she control a tiger by the tail? Features first appearances by Mongrel and Pale Flower.
 X-Men: Twisted History (In four parts; January 2000 ) Written by D. G. Chichester with art from Daerick Gross, the X-Men's original line-up gets a bit of a revamp, with Gambit, Rogue, and Colossus thrown into the mix! Read it here! 
 X-Men: The Ravages of Apocalypse (1996 one-shot) Was a promotional CyberComic story tied into the X-Men: The Ravages of Apocalypse videogame. The game itself was a commercial total conversion of the Quake engine. Written by Larry Hama, penciled by Daerick Gross.

Marvel's Excelsior Theatre
Scoop:
The only "movie" in this "theatre" was called "The Secret Adventures of Captain America - Far Flung in the Far East" and came out in five parts in 1999-2000. It was conceived by former editor and Stan-hattan Project founder James Felder and co-written by James Felder, Ben Raab and Joe Kelly with art/designs by John Cassaday and overseen by John Cerilli;  sound effects, music, animation and even the voice of Captain America was provided by Garry Schafer.  The idea was to do a Flash animated series with actors and writers contributing the characters' voices - all involved recorded parts - John Cerilli was Nick Fury, for example. Sort of a retro-modern version of the old movie serials with a bit of the Orson Welles's Mercury Theatre radio show vibe. It was discontinued after the fifth episode without bringing the story to an end for unclear reasons.

Story:
Chasing down a mysterious phenomenon in East Asia during the WWII, Cap confronts the nefarious Mandarin! A certain Sergeant Fury is present and accounted for as well, but with allies like these...

Other appearances include Dum Dum Dugan and Sgt. Fury's Howling Commandos, composed of Dino Manelli, Reb Ralston, Gabe Jones, Pinky Pinkerton and Izzey Cohen.

 Episode 1: Valley of Death
 Episode 2: In the Clutches of the Mandarin
 Episode 3: The Valley of Lost Spirits
 Episode 4: The Road of Frozen Hells
 Episode 5: Fireworks

Review:
The adventure featured numerous "firsts", including a new first meeting of Captain America and Nick Fury; one that is decidedly different than the one featured in the pages of Sgt Fury comic. Much more advanced than the CyberComics, it had music and actors performing their parts and more advanced animation. Oddly the story seemed to take the stand that Nick Fury was somehow opposed to Captain America beforehand, seeing him as some kind of glorified piece of propaganda.

See also
 Marvel Unlimited

External links
 Excelsior Theatre episodes and a write up of the process
 Marvel Digital Comics 
 
 The New York Times Article
 An interview with D. G. Chichester, Comics Bulletin

Marvel Comics titles
American webcomics
Webcomic syndicates
Internet properties established in 1996
Internet properties disestablished in 2000